Autumn Burke (born November 23, 1973) is an American politician who served as a member of the California State Assembly. A Democrat, she represented the California's 62nd State Assembly district, which encompasses portions of the Westside and the South Bay regions of Los Angeles County until she resigned on January 31, 2022.

Career 
Prior to being elected to the Assembly in 2014, she was a realtor and business consultant. She is the daughter of former Assemblywoman, Congresswoman and Los Angeles County Supervisor Yvonne Brathwaite Burke. Her mother was the first member of Congress to give birth (to Autumn) while in office. They appeared together on the March 1974 cover of Ebony magazine.

Her legislative career has included taking on several significant issues, including extension of California's Cap and Trade climate market, building local climate resiliency in disadvantaged communities, wildfire abatement, and expanding and strengthening protections for reproductive health. Additionally, she has realized significant revenue by successfully negotiating the state's implementation of the South Dakota v. Wayfair decision and by authoring the Loophole Closure and Small Business and Working Families Tax Relief Act of 2019, which provided tax relief to small businesses and funded expansion of funding to state social safety net programs.

Burke served as the chairwoman of the Committee on Revenue and Taxation and the Select Committee on Career Technical Education and Building a 21st Century Workforce. She is also a member of the Committees on Accountability and Administrative Review, Banking and Finance, Health, Utilities and Energy, the Joint Legislative Committee on Climate Change Policies, and the State Allocation Board.

She was previously vice-chair of the California Legislative Black Caucus and has served as an appointee to the Domestic Violence Advisory Council.

On February 1, 2022, Burke announced that she would not be a candidate for reelection in 2022.

2014 California State Assembly

2016 California State Assembly

2018 California State Assembly

2020 California State Assembly

References

External links 
 
 Join California Autumn Burke

Democratic Party members of the California State Assembly
Living people
People from Marina del Rey, California
Place of birth missing (living people)
1973 births
African-American state legislators in California
African-American women in politics
Women state legislators in California
21st-century American politicians
21st-century American women politicians
University of Southern California alumni
21st-century African-American women
21st-century African-American politicians
20th-century African-American people
20th-century African-American women